The pint (symbol pt, sometimes abbreviated as p) is a unit of volume or capacity in both the imperial and United States customary measurement systems. In both of those systems it is traditionally one eighth of a gallon. The British imperial pint is about 20% larger than the American pint because the two systems are defined differently. Almost all other countries have standardized on the metric system, so although some of them still also have traditional units called pints (such as for beverages), the volume varies by regional custom.

The imperial pint (≈) is used in the United Kingdom and Ireland and to a limited extent in Commonwealth nations. In the United States, two kinds of pint are used: a liquid pint (≈) and a less-common dry pint (≈). Other former British colonies, such as Canada, Australia, South Africa and New Zealand, converted to the metric system in the 1960s and 1970s; so while the term  may still be in common use in these countries, it may no longer refer to the British imperial pint once used throughout the British Empire.

Since the majority of countries in the world no longer use American or British imperial units, and most are non-English speaking, a "pint of beer" served in a tavern outside the United Kingdom and the United States may be measured by other standards. In Commonwealth countries it may be a British imperial pint of 568 mL, in countries serving large numbers of American tourists it might be a US liquid pint of 473 mL, in many metric countries it is a half-litre of 500 mL, in some places it is another measure reflecting national and local laws and customs.

Name

Pint comes from the Old French word  and perhaps ultimately from Vulgar Latin  meaning "painted", for marks painted on the side of a container to show capacity. It is linguistically related, though greatly diverging in meaning, to Pinto – an Italian, Spanish, and Portuguese name for a person with a speckled or dark complexion, often used as a surname in these languages.

Definitions

Imperial pint
The imperial pint is equal to one eighth of an imperial gallon. 
{|
|-
|1 imperial pint 
|= 
|align=right height=30| ||imperial gallon
|-
|||= 
|align=right height=30| ||imperial quart
|-
|||= 
|align=right| 4||imperial gills
|-
|||= 
|align=right| 20||imperial fluid ounces
|-
|||= 
|align=right|568.26125||millilitres (exactly)
|-
|||≈ 
|align=right|34.677429099||cubic inches
|-
|||≈ 
|align=right|1.2009499255||US liquid pints
|-
|||≈ 
|align=right|1.0320567435||US dry pints
|-
|||≈ 
|align=right|19.21519881||US fluid ounces
|-
|||≈ 
|}

US liquid pint
In the United States, the liquid pint is legally defined as one eighth of a liquid gallon of precisely 231 cubic inches.

{|
|-
|1 US liquid pint 
|= 
|align=right height=30|||US liquid gallon
|-
|||= 
|align=right height=30|||US liquid quart
|-
|||= 
|align=right|2||US cups
|-
|||= 
|align=right|4||US fluid gills
|-
|||= 
|align=right|16||US fluid ounces
|-
|||= 
|align=right|32||US tablespoons
|-
|||= 
|align=right|96||US teaspoons
|-
|||= 
|align=right|128||US fluid drams
|-
|||= 
|align=right|28.875||cubic inches (exactly)
|-
|||= 
|align=right|473.176473||millilitres (exactly)
|-
|||≈ 
|align=right|0.83267418463||imperial pints
|-
|||≈ 
|align=right|0.85936700738||US dry pints
|-
|||≈ 
|align=right|16.65348369||imperial fluid ounces
|-
|||≈ 
|}

US dry pint
In the United States, the dry pint is one sixty-fourth of a bushel.

{|
|-
|rowspan=8 valign=top|1 US dry pint
|=
|
|-
|=
|
|-
|=
|
|-
|=
|
|-
|=
|
|-
|=
|
|-
|≈
|
|-
|≈
|
|}

Other pints

The United States dry pint is equal to one eighth of a United States dry gallon. It is used in the United States, but is not as common as the liquid pint.

It remained in use until the 19th century, surviving significantly longer than most of the old Scottish measurements.

The word pint is one of numerous false friends between English and French. They are not the same unit although they have the same linguistic origin. The French word  is etymologically related, but historically described a larger unit. The Royal pint was 48 French cubic inches (952.1 mL), but regional pints varied in size depending on locality and on commodity (usually wine or olive oil) varying from 0.95 L to over 2 L. 

Thus, if "a pint of beer" is ordered in English, servers are legally required to serve an imperial pint (568 mL) of beer, but if "" is ordered in French, it is legally required to serve an imperial quart, which is 1136 mL, or twice as much. To order an imperial pint when speaking French in Canada, one must instead order .

In Flanders, the word , meaning 'little pint', refers only to a 250 mL glass of lager. Some West- and East-Flemish dialects use it as a word for beaker. The equivalent word in German, refers to a glass of a third of a litre in Cologne and the Rhineland.

In South Australia, ordering "a pint of beer" results in 425 mL (15 fl oz) being served. Customers must specifically request "an Imperial pint of beer" to get 570 mL (20 fl oz). Australians from other states often contest the size of their beers in Adelaide.

Equivalence
One US liquid pint of water weighs , which gives rise to a popular saying: "A pint's a pound, the world around".

However, the statement does not hold around the world because the British imperial pint, which was also the standard measure in Australia, India, Malaya, New Zealand, South Africa and other former British colonies, weighs , giving rise to the origin of a popular saying used in Commonwealth countries: "a pint of pure water weighs a pound and a quarter".

History
The pint is traditionally one eighth of a gallon. Because of the variety of definitions of a gallon, there have been equally many versions of the pint.

Britain's North American colonies adopted the British wine gallon, defined in 1707 as 231 cubic inches exactly (3 in × 7 in × 11 in) as their basic liquid measure, from which the US wet pint is derived; and the British corn gallon ( of a standard "Winchester" bushel of corn, or 268.8 cubic inches) as its dry measure, from which the US dry pint is derived.

In 1824, the British parliament replaced all the various gallons with a new imperial gallon based on ten pounds of distilled water at  (277.42 cubic inches), from which the current UK pint is derived.

The various Canadian provinces continued to use the Queen Anne Winchester wine gallon as a basis for their pint until 1873, well after Britain adopted the imperial system in 1824. This made the Canadian pint compatible with the American pint, but after 1824 it was incompatible with the British pint. The traditional French  used in Lower Canada (Quebec) was twice the size of the traditional English "pint" used in Upper Canada (Ontario). After four of the British provinces united in the Canadian Confederation in 1867, Canada legally adopted the British imperial system of measure in 1873, making Canadian liquid units incompatible with American ones from that year forward. Canadian imperial units of liquid measure remain incompatible with American traditional units to this day, and although the Canadian pint, quart, and gallon are still legal units of measure in Canada, they are still 20% larger than the American ones.

Historically, units called a pint (or the equivalent in the local language) were used across much of Europe, with values varying between countries from less than half a litre to over one litre. Within continental Europe, these pints were replaced with liquid measures based on the metric system during the 19th century. The term is still in limited use in parts of France, where  means an imperial quart, which is 2 imperial pints, whereas a pint is —and Central Europe, notably some areas of Germany and Switzerland, where  is colloquially used for roughly half a litre. In Spanish holiday resorts frequented by British tourists, 'pint' is often taken to mean a beer glass (especially a dimple mug).

Effects of metrication

In the British and Irish metrication processes, the pint was replaced by metric units as the legally defined primary unit of measure for trading by volume or capacity, except for the sale of draught beer and cider, and milk in returnable containers. As a supplementary unit, the pint can still be used in those countries in all circumstances. UK legislation mandates that draught beer and cider must be sold in a third of a pint, two thirds of a pint or multiples of half a pint, which must be served in stamped, measured glasses or from government-stamped meters. Milk, in returnable containers may come in pints without the metric equivalent stated. However all other goods apart from the aforementioned exceptions must be sold or labelled in metric units. Milk in plastic containers mostly comes multiples of 1 pint sizes, but are required to display the metric equivalent on packaging. Filtered milk, and UHT Milk sold in the UK is commonly sold in multiples of 1 litre bottles or containers. 
 Recipes published in the UK and Ireland would have given ingredient quantities in imperial, where the pint is used as a unit for larger liquid quantities, as well as the metric measure - though recipes written now are more likely to use metric units.

In Australia and New Zealand, a subtle change was made to 1 pint milk bottles during the conversion from imperial to metric in the 1970s. The height and diameter of the milk bottle remained unchanged, so that existing equipment for handling and storing the bottles was unaffected, but the shape was adjusted to increase the capacity from 568 mL to 600 mL—a conveniently rounded metric measure. Such milk bottles are no longer officially referred to as pints. However, the "pint glass" in pubs in Australia remains closer to the standard imperial pint, at 570 mL. It holds about 500 mL of beer and about 70 mL of froth, except in South Australia, where a pint is served in a 425 mL glass and a 570 mL glass is called an "imperial pint". In New Zealand, there is no longer any legal requirement for beer to be served in standard measures: in pubs, the largest size of glass, which is referred to as a pint, varies, but usually contains 425 mL.

After metrication in Canada, milk and other liquids in pre-packaged containers came in metric sizes so conversion issues could no longer arise. Draft beer in Canada, when advertised as a "pint", is legally required to be an imperial pint (568 mL). With the allowed margin of error of 0.5 fluid ounces, a "pint" that is less than 554 mL of beer is an offence, though this regulation is often violated and rarely enforced. To avoid legal issues, many drinking establishments are moving away from using the term "pint" and are selling "glasses" or "sleeves" of beer, neither of which have a legal definition.

A 375 mL bottle of liquor in the US and the Canadian maritime provinces is sometimes referred to as a "pint" and a 200 mL bottle is called a "half-pint", harking back to the days when liquor came in US pints, fifths, quarts, and half-gallons. Liquor in the US has been sold in metric-sized bottles since 1980 although beer is still sold in US traditional units.

Notes

References

External links

European Commission press release (IP/07/1297, 11 September 2007): Pints and miles will not disappear due to European Commission proposal

Imperial units
Units of volume
Alcohol measurement
Cooking weights and measures
Customary units of measurement in the United States